Garden Gaia is the ninth studio album by German electronic producer Pantha du Prince, released August 26, 2022, by Modern Recordings.

Track listing

Personnel 
 Hendrik Weber – drums (2, 3), percussion (2, 4, 5), vocals (4, 6), bells (5), engineering (1-4, 6-9), programming (1, 7, 8)
 Håkon Stene – drums (1, 5), percussion (1, 2), Moog Guitar (1), additional recording (1, 5)
 Rob Waring – percussion (1, 5), drums (5), arranger (1), bells (5)
 Friedrich Wolf – drums (1), guitar (1, 4)
 Kassian Troyer – engineering
 Tobias Levin – engineering (1, 3, 8), programming (8)
 Friedrich Paravicini – cello (3, 9), violin (9), engineering (3, 9)
 Bendik Hovik Kjeldsberg – remixing (4, 6), engineering (4, 6), drum programming (4)
 Helena Tusvik Rosenlund – vocals (4)

References 

2022 albums
Pantha du Prince albums